In mathematics, differential rings, differential fields, and differential algebras are rings, fields, and algebras equipped with finitely many derivations, which are unary functions that are linear and satisfy the Leibniz product rule.  A natural example of a differential field is the field of rational functions in one variable over the complex numbers,  where the derivation is differentiation with respect to 

Differential algebra refers also to the area of mathematics consisting in the study of these algebraic objects and their use in the algebraic study of differential equations. Differential algebra was introduced by Joseph Ritt in 1950.

Open problems

The biggest open problems in the field include the Kolchin catenary conjecture, the Ritt problem, and the Jacobi bound problem.
All of these deal with the structure of differential ideals in differential rings.

Differential ring

A differential ring is a ring  equipped with one or more derivations, which are homomorphisms of additive groups

such that each derivation  satisfies the Leibniz product rule

for every   Note that the ring could be noncommutative, so the somewhat standard  form of the product rule in commutative settings may be false.  If  is multiplication on the ring, the product rule is the identity

where  means the function which maps a pair  to the pair 

Note that a differential ring is a (not necessarily graded) -differential algebra.

Differential field

A differential field is a commutative field  equipped with derivations.

The well-known formula for differentiating fractions

follows from the product rule. Indeed, we must have

By the product rule, 

Solving with respect to  we obtain the sought identity.

A differential algebra over a field  is a -algebra  wherein the derivation(s) commutes with the scalar multiplication. That is, for all  and  

If  is the ring homomorphism to the center of A defining scalar multiplication on the algebra, one has

As above, the derivation must obey the Leibniz rule over the algebra multiplication, and must be linear over addition. Thus, for all  and 

and

Derivation on a Lie algebra

A derivation on a Lie algebra  is a linear map  satisfying the Leibniz rule:

Any such derivation is called an inner derivation. This derivation extends to the universal enveloping algebra of the Lie algebra.

Examples

Any ring is a differential ring with respect to the trivial derivation which maps any ring element to zero.

The field  has a unique structure as a differential field, determined by setting   the field axioms along with the axioms for derivations  ensure that the derivation is differentiation with respect to  For example, by commutativity of multiplication and the Leibniz law one has that 

The differential field  fails to have a solution to the differential equation

but expands to a larger differential field including the function  which does have a solution to this equation.
A differential field with solutions to all systems of differential equations is called a differentially closed field.  Such fields exist, although they do not appear as natural algebraic or geometric objects.  All differential fields (of bounded cardinality) embed into a large differentially closed field.  Differential fields are the objects of study in differential Galois theory.

Naturally occurring examples of derivations are partial derivatives, Lie derivatives, the Pincherle derivative, and the commutator with respect to an element of an algebra.

Weyl Algebra
Every differential ring  has a naturally associated Weyl algebra , which is a noncommutative ring where  and  satisfy the relation . 

Such  modules are called D-modules. 
In particular  itself is a -module. 

For a differential rings  there is an embedding of the Weyl algebra in the ring of pseudodifferential operators  as the finite tails of these infinite series.

Ring of pseudo-differential operators

Differential rings and differential algebras are often studied by means of the ring of pseudo-differential operators on them.

This is the set of formal infinite sums

where  means that the sum runs on all integers that are not greater than a fixed (finite) value.

This set is made a ring with the multiplication defined by linearly extending the following formula for "monomials":

where  is the binomial coefficient.
In particular, one has

See also

 
 
 
 
 
 
  − a differential algebra with an additional grading.
  − an algebraic structure with several differential operators acting on it.

References

 
 
 
  As PDF

External links
 David Marker's home page has several online surveys  discussing differential fields.